Ahadi is an Iranian surname. Notable people with the surname include:

 Ahadi (The Lion King), a character from the fictive world of The Lion King
 Mina Ahadi, Iranian Communist political activist
 Reza Ahadi, Iranian footballer

Astronomy
 Pi Puppis, a star located in the constellation Puppis unofficially named Ahadi

See also
 Ahad (disambiguation)
Ahadi is another way of saying promise in some other languages such as African languages

References

Iranian-language surnames